The Physician may refer to:
 The Physician, a 1986 novel by Noah Gordon
 The Physician (1928 film), a British silent drama film directed by Georg Jacoby
 The Physician (2013 film), a German drama film directed by Philipp Stölzl
 The Physician (Dou), a 1653 painting by Gerrit Dou